Yacine El-Mahdi Oualid (born 12 June 1993) the Algerian Minister of Knowledge Economy, Start-ups and Micro-enterprises. He was appointed as minister on 2 January 2020.

Education 
Qualid holds a Doctor of Medicine from the Sidi Bel Abbès University.

References 

1993 births
Living people
21st-century Algerian politicians
Algerian politicians
Government ministers of Algeria